Hokuma Abbasali gizi Gurbanova (June 11, 1913, Baku, Russian Empire – November 2, 1988, Baku, Azerbaijan SSR) was an Azerbaijani and Soviet stage and film actress. People's Artist of the USSR (1965).

Biography
Hokuma Gurbanova was born in Baku, Russian Empire. In 1931, she graduated from a pedagogical college of Baku. In 1931 to 1932, she studied piano at the Baku Academy of Music. 

Gurbanova was briefly married to actor Alasgar Alakbarov and gave birth to a daughter, Naila. Gurbanova had another daughter, Vafa, also an actress, from her second marriage to stage decorator Nusrat Fatullayev.

Gurbanova's career as an actress began in 1933, at the Azerbaijanfilm studio, when she played the role of Yakhshi in one of the earliest Soviet Azerbaijani feature films Almas, chosen for the role by screenwriter Jafar Jabbarly himself. From 1938, she performed in a troupe of Azerbaijan State Academic National Drama Theatre in various drama genres. Hokuma Gurbanova was a member of the Union of Cinematographers’ of the Azerbaijan SSR and member of the Supreme Soviet of the Azerbaijan SSR of the 7th and 8th convocations. 

She died on November 2, 1988 in Baku and was buried in the Alley of Honor.

Awards and titles 
 People's Artist of the USSR (1965)
 Mirza Fatali Akhundov State Prize of the Azerbaijan SSR (1965)
 Order of Lenin (1959)
 Order of the Red Banner of Labour (1973)
 Order of the Badge of Honour (1949)
 Medals

Theatrical works
 “Vagif” by Samad Vurgun (first performance) – Tamara
 “Farhad and Shirin” by Samad Vurgun – Shirin
 “Javanshir” by Mehdi Huseyn – Reyhan
 “The bride of fire” by Jafar Jabbarly – Solmaz
 “Bumpkin” by Mirza Ibrahimov – Banovsha
 “Antony and Cleopatra” by Shakespeare – Cleopatra

Filmography
 1972 – “Habib – sovereign of snakes”
 1967 – “Man drops anchor” – Shamana
 1965 – “Woolen scarf”
 1962 – “I will dance” – Bikatu
 1961 – “The life teaches”
 1959 – “Can he be forgiven?”
 1943 – “One family” – Leyla
 1936 – “Almas” – Yakshi

See also
 List of People's Artists of the Azerbaijan SSR

References

1913 births
1988 deaths
20th-century Azerbaijani actresses
Actors from Baku
Honored Artists of the Azerbaijan SSR
People's Artists of the Azerbaijan SSR
People's Artists of the USSR
Recipients of the Order of Lenin
Recipients of the Order of the Red Banner of Labour
Azerbaijani film actresses
Azerbaijani stage actresses
Soviet Azerbaijani people
Soviet film actresses
Soviet stage actresses
Burials at Alley of Honor